Charles Robertson Young (2 February 1852 — 12 April 1913) was an English first-class cricketer. 

The son of D. Young, an assistant superintendent in the Revenue Survey of the Indian Civil Service, Young was born in British India at Dharwar in February 1852. Young made his debut in first-class cricket for Hampshire against Kent at Gravesend in 1867. At the time, he was aged 15 years and 131 days, making him the youngest debutant in first-class cricket. His record was eventually surpassed by the Indian cricketer Mohammad Ramzan who was aged 12 years and 247 days on his first-class debut in October 1937. His record did however remain an English first-class record until 2011, when Yorkshire's Barney Gibson debuted aged 15 years and 27 days. During his debut, Young scored 20 not out batting at number 9 and took his maiden wicket, that of Kent opening batsman George Bennett. He made a further two appearances in 1867, both against Kent. 

As a professional cricketer, he was engaged by various clubs over the proceeding decade. These included spells playing for Dumfries Cricket Club in Scotland in 1875–76, and Stubbington Cricket Club near Fareham in 1877. It was in 1877 that he returned to playing first-class cricket for Hampshire, when he was selected against Derbyshire.

Young represented Hampshire for 18 years in which time he played 38 matches for the club. His final match against Kent, the team he made his debut against 18 years previously, came in Hampshire's final match as a first-class county until the 1895 County Championship. His career with the club yielded him 149 wickets at an average of 21.86, taking ten wickets in a match three times.

Whilst resident at Southampton, he was otherwise employed as a clerk. He died at Bolton, Lancashire on 12 April 1913.

References

External links

1852 births
1913 deaths
People from Dharwad
English cricketers
Hampshire cricketers